The Social Democratic Party of Hungarian Gypsies (MCSZDP), was a short-lived social democrat political party in Hungary for the ethnic Romani minority, existed between 1989 and 1991.

History
The MCSZDP held its inaugural meeting on 1 October 1989 with 90 members under the leadership of writer and journalist Pál Farkas, also President of the Cultural Association of Hungarian Gypsies and editor-in-chief of the Cigány Újság from 1986 to 1993. The party claimed itself as a sister party to the Hungarian Social Democratic Party (MSZDP). In its programme, called "Romani people, Europe with Us!", the MCSZDP emphasized the legal and economic integration of the Romani people and also fought against ethnic discrimination.

In November 1989, Farkas was elected to the presidency of the MSZDP. The two parties made an electoral cooperation for joint participation in the 1990 parliamentary election, but for the following months, the MCSZDP gradually moved away from its parent organization due internal conflicts. The MCSZDP was able to nominee only one candidate (Elemér Csemer in Pásztó constituency) in the 1990 national election, receiving 0.01 percent of the individual votes. After the failure, the party transformed itself into a civil organization, called Romani Civil Rights Movement.

Election results

National Assembly

References

Sources

1989 establishments in Hungary
1991 disestablishments in Hungary
Defunct political parties in Hungary
Political parties disestablished in 1991
Political parties established in 1989
Romani political parties
Social democratic parties in Hungary